Flemish Energy Agency (VEA) is a government agency of the Flemish Region under the Flemish Ministry of Environment, Nature and Energy, tasked with the preparation and execution of Flemish energy policy.

Overview
The agency was created by a decision of the Flemish government dated April 16, 2004 as part of the government reform project Beter Bestuurlijk Beleid. By a decision of the Flemish Government of March 31, 2006, the agency began operation on April 1, 2006. It is led by an Administrator-General, who is appointed by the Flemish Government for a renewable six year term.

The agency is made up out of the parts, responsible for energy, of the former Division of Natural Resources and Energy (ANRE) of the Flemish administration. It currently has some 85 employees.

The agency has its main office in Brussel and has offices in Gent and Hasselt. The agency employs a highly educated, technically trained staff, about two thirds of whom are engineers, legal and environmental protection specialists.

Mission
The Flemish Energy Agency has the following tasks:
 The promotion and support of the use of renewable energy and green energy;
 The promotion and support of energy conservation by means of:
 building standards with regards to energy;
 emission trading;
 covenants with the industry;
 energy demand management;
 reporting in the field of energy economics;
 The development and execution of social energy policy;
 Communication to the industry and general public with regard to these aforementioned issues.

The agency works closely with other Flemish agencies and administrations, as well as with the federal and local governments to develop new decrees and regulations and to enforce existing energy regulations. To enforce the compliance to energy regulations, the agency has the power to impose administrative sanctions, for instance fines, as punishment for non-compliance.

See also

 International Energy Agency
 SmartGrids
 Flemish institute for technological research (VITO)

External links
 Official website

Science and technology in Belgium
Energy in Belgium
Flemish government departments and agencies
Energy organizations